William Téchoueyres (born 12 February 1966) is a former French rugby union footballer. He played as a wing.

He spent his career at Stade Bordelais. He had three caps for France, twice at the Five Nations in 1994, and one at the 1995 Rugby World Cup finals. Téchoueyres played in the 54–18 win over Côte d'Ivoire, scoring a try.

External links
 William Téchoueyres International Statistics

1966 births
France international rugby union players
French rugby union players
living people
rugby union wings
Stade Bordelais players
Sportspeople from Bordeaux
CA Bordeaux-Bègles Gironde players
SU Agen Lot-et-Garonne players